Kattumala (കാട്ടുമല) is one of the highest peaks in the Idukki district in Kerala, India. It is the second highest peak in the Eravikulam National Park after Anamudi. It is also located near to Munnar. It stand at an altitude of 2,552m above sea level. It is the Eighth Highest Peak in South India. The Peak of Perumal Mala also lies very close to this peak.

References

Mountains of Kerala
Geography of Idukki district
Mountains of the Western Ghats
Two-thousanders of Asia